This is a list of bulk carriers, both those in service and those which have ceased to operate. Bulk carriers are a type of cargo ship that transports unpackaged bulk cargo. For ships that have sailed under multiple names, their most recent name is used and former names are listed in the Notes section.

Bulk carriers

Panamax 
Panamax

Lake freighters 
Lake freighters

Ore-bulk-oil carriers 
Ore-bulk-oil carriers (OBO)

Very large ore carriers 
Very large ore carriers (VLOC)

Strategic sealift bulk carriers 

Strategic sealift ships are cargo ships operated by the United States Navy's Military Sealift Command. Those ships which are dry cargo/ammunition ships (T-AKE and T-AK) and considered bulk carriers are listed here.

See also 

 Lists of ships

References 

Bulk carriers